Jan Bárta (born 7 December 1984) is a Czech professional road cyclist, who rides for UCI Continental team .

Major results
Source: 

2003
 1st  Road race, National Under-23 Road Championships
2007
 7th Overall Tour de Hongrie
 9th Prague–Karlovy Vary–Prague
2008
 2nd Raiffeisen Grand Prix
2009
 1st Stage 4 Tour of Austria
 3rd Overall Rás Tailteann
2010
 2nd Time trial, National Road Championships
 4th Prague–Karlovy Vary–Prague
 7th Overall Tour de Normandie
 7th Overall Okolo Slovenska
2011
 2nd Time trial, National Road Championships
 3rd Overall Tour of Britain
 8th Overall Tour of Austria
2012
 1st  Time trial, National Road Championships
 1st  Overall Settimana Internazionale di Coppi e Bartali
1st Stages 2b (TTT) & 5 (ITT)
 1st Rund um Köln
 7th Time trial, UCI Road World Championships
2013
 National Road Championships
1st  Road race
1st  Time trial
 1st  Overall Szlakiem Grodów Piastowskich
1st  Points classification
1st Stage 2 (ITT)
 2nd Overall Circuit de la Sarthe
 3rd Overall Bayern–Rundfahrt
 6th Overall Czech Cycling Tour
2014
 National Road Championships
1st  Time trial
3rd Road race
 6th Overall Bayern–Rundfahrt
 6th Visegrad 4 Bicycle Race – GP Czech Republic
 9th Time trial, UCI Road World Championships
 9th Overall Tour of Britain
 10th Overall Driedaagse van West-Vlaanderen
  Combativity award Stage 3 Tour de France
2015
 1st  Time trial, National Road Championships
 2nd Overall Czech Cycling Tour
 3rd Overall Bayern–Rundfahrt
 4th Overall Driedaagse van West-Vlaanderen
  Combativity award Stage 3 Tour de France
2016
 2nd Time trial, National Road Championships
 3rd Overall Tour of Slovenia
2017
 1st  Time trial, National Road Championships
 2nd Overall Czech Cycling Tour
 10th Time trial, UEC European Road Championships
2018
 National Road Championships
2nd Road race
2nd Time trial
 4th Overall Szlakiem Walk Majora Hubala
 4th Overall Szlakiem Grodów Piastowskich
 7th Overall Sibiu Cycling Tour
 8th Overall Okolo Jižních Čech
2019
 1st  Time trial, National Road Championships
 1st  Overall Tour du Loir-et-Cher
 1st Prologue Tour de Hongrie
 European Games
3rd  Time trial
9th Road race
 4th Overall Rhône-Alpes Isère Tour
 5th Overall Tour of Romania
 6th Overall Dookoła Mazowsza
 6th Overall Czech Cycling Tour
2020
 2nd Time trial, National Road Championships
 9th Time trial, UEC European Road Championships
2021
 1st  Overall Course de Solidarność et des Champions Olympiques
1st Stage 4
 2nd Time trial, National Road Championships
 10th Overall Circuit des Ardennes
2022
 National Road Championships
1st  Time trial
2nd Road race
 7th Overall Tour of Małopolska

Grand Tour general classification results timeline

References

External links

Jan Bárta profile at Team NetApp

1984 births
Living people
Czech male cyclists
People from Kyjov
Cyclists at the 2012 Summer Olympics
Cyclists at the 2016 Summer Olympics
Olympic cyclists of the Czech Republic
Cyclists at the 2019 European Games
European Games medalists in cycling
European Games bronze medalists for the Czech Republic
Sportspeople from the South Moravian Region